The Perry Street and District League, commonly known as the Perry Street League, is a football competition with clubs from south Somerset, west Dorset and East Devon, England. The league was formed in 1903 by Charles Edward Small, the owner of the Perry Street Lace Works, who is commemorated by the three spools of lace depicted on the league's crest.

Today the league has a total of four divisions including the Perry Street League Premier Division.  The Perry Street League is a member of the Joint Liaison Committee comprising the Somerset County League and other feeder leagues within the county.  The Perry Street League is affiliated to the Somerset County FA.

South Petherton won the 2005–06 Premier Division title, a feat they repeated in 2006–07 and again in 2007–08. They finished second in the 2008–09 season as Crewkerne took the title, and second again in the 2009–10 to Lyme Regis. South Petherton again won the league in the 2010–11 season.

The fixtures and results can be found in the local Chard & Ilminster Newspaper; the Weekender and View From titles also offer extensive coverage reports and previews.

Member clubs 2021–22

Premier Division
Chard United
Crewkerne Rangers 
Forton Rangers  
Halstock
Hawkchurch 
Ilminster Town Reserves 
Misterton
Perry Street & Yonder Hill 
South Petherton
West & Middle Chinnock

Division One
Barrington
Combe St Nicholas Reserves 
Dowlish Wake & Donyatt
Forton Rangers Reserves
Lyme Regis Rovers 
Misterton Reserves 
Pymore
Shepton Beauchamp
South Petherton Reserves 
Waytown Hounds

Division Two
Chard Rangers 
Chard United Reserves
Charmouth 
Crewkerne Rangers Reserves 
Donyatt United
Drimpton 
Ilminster Town 'A'  
Netherbury 
Shepton Beauchamp Reserves 
Thorncombe 
Winsham United 
    
Division Three
Barrington Reserves
Combe St Nicholas 'A'
Crewkerne Rangers 'A' 
Farway United Reserves
Ilminster Town 'B'
Kingsbury Episcopi 
Merriott Dynamos 
Merriott Saints  
Pen Mill Athletic United 
Perry Street & Yonder Hill Reserves  
Thorncombe Reserves 
Uplyme Reserves

Recent divisional champions

List of league champions

Source

Trophy/cup competitions
All cup competitions (except Chard Hospital Cup) are governed by the rules of 
The Perry Street Challenge Cup

Premier Division
The Perry Street Challenge Cup
Founded 1912.
Cup Presented by C. E. Small Esq

Coronation Cup
Founded 1953
Cup Presented by C. H. Baulch Esq

Division One
Division One Cup
Founded 1954
Cup Presented by C.H.Harris Esq

The Arthur Gage Memorial Cup
Founded 1950

Division Two
Jack Venn Cup
Founded 1961 
Cup Presented by J. V. Venn Esq.

Tommy Tabberer Cup
Founded 1961
Cup Presented by Lyme Regis Football Club

Division Three
John Fowler Trophy
Founded 1973
Cup Presented by Halstock Football Club.

Bill Bailey Cup
Founded 1973
Cup Presented by Beaminster Football Club

Other cups
The Daisy Hutchings Memorial Cup
Founded 1970
Open to all clubs in Divisions 2 and 3 of The Perry Street & District League
Clubs can only enter one team.

Chard Hospital Cup Open to clubs as decided by the Management Committee

References

External links
FA Full time page

 
1903 establishments in England
Football leagues in England
Football in Somerset
Football in Dorset
Football in Devon
Sports leagues established in 1903